The 1960 French motorcycle Grand Prix was the first round of the 1960 Grand Prix motorcycle racing season. It took place on 22 May 1960 at the Clermont-Ferrand circuit.

500 cc classification

350 cc classification

Sidecar classification

References

French motorcycle Grand Prix
French
Motorcycle Grand Prix